Zillmere Eagles Australian Football Club (formerly Windsor-Zillmere, North Brisbane and Northern Eagles) is an Australian rules football club based in the suburb of Zillmere in the northern suburbs of Brisbane. The team plays in the QAFA Division 4. 

It reformed the senior side in 2013 and it was undefeated all year in the SEQAFL State Div 4 northern competition. Zillmere once competed in the AFL Queensland Australian Football League, where it ceased to play in 2008.

The club also fields women's (in the AFL Queensland Women's League) and junior teams.

History
The original Zillmere FC had been established in 1923. The team won 13 QAFL championships until 1962, when the "Windsor-Zillmere FC" was formed from the merger of Zillmere and neighbouring Windsor Football Club. The club would win four QAFL premierships (and being runner-ups three times) between 1975 and 1988. 

Another merged was in 1991, when Zillmere joined Sandgate to form "North Brisbane FC". Under that name, the club won the 1995 QAFL championship, but financial difficulties forced it into recess in 1996. A re-financed "Northern Eagles" were formed in 1997, then renamed "Zillmere Eagles" in 2005.

In October 2008, the AFLQ transferred the licence from Zillmere Eagles to neighbouring club Aspley as part of an independent review which looked into the best long term option for Australian football in North Brisbane.

Notable former players
A number of other players have been drafted from the Zillmere Eagles after playing a handful of games but they have been produced by junior clubs surrounding Zillmere. 
The club has produced several notable players for the Australian Football League including:

Men's
 Frank Dunell
 Mitch Hahn
 Robert Copeland
 Josh Drummond
 Danny Dickfos
 Brendan Whitecross
 Daniel Pratt
 Marcus Allan
 Brett Backwell
 Zac Smith
 Ben Warren
 Craig Brittain
 Daniel Dzufer
 Reuben William

Women's
 Ally Anderson
 Tayla Harris
 Sharni Webb
 Sophie Conway
 Jacqui Yorston 
 Shaleise Law

Honours

Premierships 
 QAFL (18): 1929, 1930, 1932, 1933, 1936, 1937, 1938, 1939, 1940, 1947, 1949, 1950, 1951, 1975, 1976, 1981, 1988, 1995 
 QFA (3): 2013, 2016, 2017

Notes

Grogan Medallists 
The Grogan Medal is awarded to the best and fairest player in an AFLQ season. The club have had 7 players win the award.

 Dick Parton – 1949
 Robin Hull – 1967
 Terry Weller – 1969
 Barry Karklis – 1980
 Craig Brittain – 1988
 Cameron Buchanan – 1991
 Danny Dickfos – 2000
 Matty Payne – 2006

Coach of the Year

 Murray Davis - 2006

References

External links

 Official site

Zillmere
Australian rules football clubs in Brisbane
1923 establishments in Australia
Australian rules football clubs established in 1923